Misa Telefoni Retzlaff (born Hermann Theodor Retzlaff, 21 May 1952) is a Samoan author and retired politician who served as the deputy prime minister of Samoa and deputy leader of the Human Rights Protection Party from 2001 to 2011. A member of the Human Rights Protection Party, Retzlaff was also minister of finance from 2006 to 2011.

Background
Retzlaff is of German-Swedish-Samoan descent, having inherited his German ancestry from his paternal grandfather.  His name "Telefoni", is the name that was given by the Samoan community in the early twentieth century, to his grandfather, when he arrived in the German colony, as a public servant of the postal services, to introduce the telephone to the country. He was educated at Marist Brothers in Apia and King's College in Auckland, New Zealand.  He studied law at the University of Auckland, graduating in 1974. After returning to Samoa, he studied to become a Certified Public Accountant, graduating in 1977, before going on to practice law. He was appointed Attorney-General of Samoa in 1986.

Political career
In 1988 he resigned his position as Attorney-general to run for election, winning the seat of Falelatai & Samatau. Initially part of the opposition, he joined the government of Tofilau Eti Alesana in 1991 as Minister of Agriculture, Forests, Fisheries and Shipping. In 1996 he became Minister of Health, and in 2001, Deputy Prime Minister and Minister of Finance. In 2006 he was appointed Minister of Tourism, Trade, Labor and Commerce. He retired at the 2011 general election.

Publications
Retzlaff has had two books published; "Love and Money", a love story about the richest young bachelor in Auckland New Zealand falling in love with and marrying the young Samoan kitchen help from his exclusive boarding school; and "To Thine Own Self be True", a collection of articles, speeches and poems. In 2021 he published an autobiography, Tautua – Memoirs of a Public Servant.

References

1952 births
Samoan people of German descent
Members of the Legislative Assembly of Samoa
University of Auckland alumni
Samoan lawyers
Living people
Attorneys General of Samoa
Deputy Prime Ministers of Samoa
Finance ministers of Samoa
Health ministers of Samoa
Government ministers of Samoa
Human Rights Protection Party politicians